"Swimming Pools (Drank)" is a song by American rapper Kendrick Lamar. It was released on July 31, 2012 as the lead single (second overall) from his major-label debut studio album Good Kid, M.A.A.D City (2012), by Top Dawg, Aftermath and Interscope. The song was written by Lamar and Tyler "T-Minus" Williams, the latter of whom also produced the song. The song, mixed by Dr. Dre and Top Dawg's engineer Derek "MixedByAli" Ali, propelled Lamar to mainstream popularity. The song peaked at number 17 on the US Billboard Hot 100, in its thirteenth week of charting, after gradually climbing up the chart. It debuted on the Hot 100 at number 100 and progressed from number 55 and 32 to its peak. "Swimming Pools (Drank)" also serves as Lamar's first entry on the UK Singles Chart, where it debuted at number 63.

A music video was released to accompany the song in August 2012. It was featured in the 2013 game Saints Row IV, the 2014 re-release of the game Grand Theft Auto V, and on a 2013 episode of Grey's Anatomy. On January 26, 2013, Lamar performed the song on Saturday Night Live, as well as his third single "Poetic Justice". The music video was nominated for Best Male Video and Best Hip-Hop Video at the 2013 MTV Video Music Awards. The song was later nominated for Best Rap Performance at the 56th Annual Grammy Awards.

Background
The single is an introspective regarding Lamar's family and social life, alcoholism, and the peer pressure that accompanies it amongst his friends. In the first verse, he remembers his grandfather's drinking and resulting death, and the reasons that led Lamar himself to drinking.

Critical reception
The song garnered acclaim from music critics upon its release. Rolling Stone ranked the song the 34th best of 2012. XXL named it one of the top five hip hop songs of 2012.

Live performances
Lamar performed "Swimming Pools (Drank)" at every show on The Damn Tour.

Chart performance
In its first week of release, the song debuted at number 100 on the Billboard Hot 100 and remained within the chart for another week then fell, but two weeks later re-entered the Hot 100 and climbed up each week, progressing from the top 90 to number 81, 71 and 61. In its tenth week, "Swimming Pools (Drank)" climbed up to number 55 and the following week, entered the top 40 of the Hot 100 at number 32, moving up to 25 and peaking at number 17. On the UK Singles Chart, the song entered at number 63, remaining in the top 100 for one week. The song is Lamar's sixth highest-charting solo single on the Billboard Hot 100 behind "DNA." which debuted and peaked at number four and "HUMBLE." which debuted at number two and peaked at number one (though his features on "Fuckin' Problems" and "Bad Blood" reached the top 10 in the United States) and on the UK Singles Chart.

Music video
The music video, directed by Jerome D, premiered August 3, 2012 on 106 & Park. A review by the magazine Rolling Stone shared a summary of the video stating: "In his new video for 'Swimming Pools (Drank),' Kendrick Lamar defies gravity, floating and tumbling in suspended space as liquor bottles fly upwards and smash into the ceiling. The rapper gets introspective on a woozy beat, considering the highs and lows of alcohol consumption and the sense of confidence it bestows upon the drinker. Lamar spends most of the video rapping alone, but color-filtered shots of a booze-soaked rager poke through the more contemplative scenes."

Track listing

Remixes
The official remix featuring his Black Hippy cohorts – Ab-Soul, Jay Rock and Schoolboy Q was included as a bonus track on the Target deluxe edition of Good Kid, M.A.A.D City. On March 14, 2013, producer Dev Hynes uploaded a reinterpreted rendition of the track by English R&B group, Mutya Keisha Siobhan to his official SoundCloud page. The track, entitled "Lay Down in Swimming Pools", features an interpolation of the original Lamar song. Hynes later commented saying: "Just finished recording new music with Mutya, Keisha and Siobhan, and the girls felt like having a bit of fun at the end of the last session – enjoy!!". Lloyd and August Alsina have also released a remix of the song.

Charts

Weekly charts

Year-end charts

Certifications

Release history

References

External links
 

2012 singles
Aftermath Entertainment singles
Interscope Records singles
Kendrick Lamar songs
Song recordings produced by T-Minus (record producer)
Songs about alcohol
Songs written by Kendrick Lamar
Top Dawg Entertainment singles
Songs written by T-Minus (record producer)
2012 songs